Nu Alpha Kappa, is a Latino-based fraternity, which encompasses and values all cultures. Nu Alpha Kappa is the largest Latino-based fraternity  on the west coast.

Often referred to as "NAK", Nu Alpha Kappa was founded on February 26, 1988 on the campus of California Polytechnic State University, with 28 established chapters across California, Nevada, and Colorado. Nu Alpha Kappa was a charter member of the National Association of Latino Fraternal Organizations (NALFO), but is now a member of the North American Interfraternity Conference.

History 

"Xinaco", a Nahuatl word used by the Olmecs, describes an educated, amiable individual whose personality and charisma transcends and enlightens all cultures and social classes. The "Xinakos" (CHI-Na-Kos) meeting resulted in the creation of a new fraternity. The foundations of the fraternity were started by fifteen good friends at Cal Poly San Luis Obispo, California, of which eleven would become founding fathers of the fraternity. This marked the beginning of Nu Alpha Kappa Fraternity, an organization based on the belief of a commitment to "Carnalismo" or brotherhood, the search for knowledge and the retention and pride of culture.

Nu Alpha Kappa was established on February 26, 1988 on the campus of Cal Poly San Luis Obispo by Antonio Arreola, Marin Arreola, Nicolas Arreola, Ernesto Garcia, Moises Herrera, Jesse Martinez, Hector Mendoza, Joel Romero, Alberto Salazar, Antonio Valenzuela, and Ramiro Ramos.

Adapting the term 'Nako' to the university fraternity system, the group officially became Nu Alpha Kappa Fraternity, or NAK for short.

National events 
National Leadership Development Conference (NLDC) – A leadership development weekend which invites the executive board of each chapter, alumni and the National Board to convene on new policies and strategies for the upcoming academic year. Over 200 brothers come together to learn from each other and take back knowledge to their chapters and communities for a successful year. Workshops, discussions and lectures are conducted by National Board, NAK alumni, Campus advisors and administrators. Each year a different chapter has the opportunity to host this event during the late Summer.

National Intake Summit (NIS) – An opportunity to bring together all potential brothers, known as prospective members, from each chapter for a weekend of team building, leadership development and a large community service event. The experiences and memories incorporated throughout the weekend ignite the flame of brotherhood for the next generation of NAK brothers. Each year a different chapter has the opportunity to host this event during the late Fall.

NAKFest – An annual family reunion between alumni and undergraduate brothers which brings together the past with the present. A weekend event hosted by a different chapter each year which consists of the National Elections, Sports Tournament, Awards Banquet, and National Party. A one-day double-elimination sports tournament is held with all chapters, with the winner receiving a first round bye during the NSL tournament and year of bragging rights. A Spring time event which helps close out the academic year allowing brothers to network and continue to build upon the unseen bond of brotherhood.

NAK Sports League (NSL) – A year-long brotherhood event giving chapters the opportunity to network and convene in a friendly sports competition. A different chapter serves as hosts of the first-round games between two chapters outside of their region. The Semi-Finals and Championship Game are concluded at NAKFest.

NAK Alumni softball tournament – An annual softball tournament among the NAK Alumni Associations. This weekend tournament typically involves the local alumni associations around NAK.

National philanthropy 
The National Marrow Donor Program (NMDP), created in 1986, is a non-profit organization based in Minneapolis, Minnesota.

The Hispanos Dando Esperanza: Nu Alpha Kappa-Hermandad Initiative is dedicated to outreaching the Hispanic/Latino communities.

This Hispanic/Latino Stem Cell and Marrow Initiative focus efforts throughout California, Colorado and Nevada with 992 National Marrow Donor Program donor centers and 10 recruitment groups, including Nu Alpha Kappa Chapters.

Alumni 
The NAK National Alumni Association was officially enacted in 2014.

National chapters 
Nu Alpha Kappa has established chapters across universities in California, Nevada and Colorado.

See also
List of social fraternities and sororities

Notes

External links 

Student organizations established in 1988
North American Interfraternity Conference
Student societies in the United States
Hispanic and Latino American organizations
Latino fraternities and sororities
1988 establishments in California